Ritesh Thapa (born 2 April 1986) is a former footballer from Nepal. He made his first appearance for the Nepal national football team in 2003.
He played for Nepal Police Club.

Club career
Thapa was born in Itahari, Nepal. Thapa started his career with the Three Star Club, but joined the Nepal Police Club four years later in 2004. He has won many achievements with the Nepali Police Club, including a runner's up medal at the 2007 AFC President's Cup. He has also won the Martyr's Memorial A-Division League four times with the Nepali Police Club.

International career
Thapa made his debut for Nepal on September 29, 2003 although it was a dark day in his country's football history. Nepal were playing South Korea in the 2004 AFC Asian Cup qualification and lost by a record 16-0 scoreline. Thapa came on as a half time substitute for goalkeeper Ujjwal Manadhar in the game.

Thapa played two games at the 2012 Nehru Cup, picking up one yellow card.

He has made twelve appearances for his country so far.

Honours
AFC President's Cup
Runners-up: 2007
Martyr's Memorial A-Division League
Winner: 2006–07, 2010, 2011, 2011–12
Runners-up: 2004–05

Playing style
Thapa is known as a hardworking and dependable player in the squad and always has a positive attitude. He however lacks concentration during games.

Personal life
Thapa is married.

Match fixing allegations
On 14 October 2015 Thapa, along with teammates Sagar Thapa, Sandip Rai, Bikash Singh Chhetri, and former Three Star Club coach Anjan KC were arrested by the Nepal Police on suspicion that the group was responsible for match-fixing at the domestic and international level. On 19 October 2015 Rai and the four others were banned by the Asian Football Confederation.

References 

1986 births
Living people
People from Sunsari District
Nepalese footballers
Nepal international footballers
Association football goalkeepers
Sportspeople involved in betting scandals